Tovertafel ("Magic Table") is a games console designed for use in healthcare settings that was launched in 2015 by the Dutch medical technologies company Active Cues. The console contains a high-quality projector, infrared sensors, a loudspeaker and a processor with which interactive games are projected onto a table. The console has been developed for people with cognitive challenges in care institutions, daycare, public libraries and schools. There are variants for various target groups, including people with dementia, people with an intellectual disability and children with a developmental disorder.

The device has been used in institutions in the Netherlands, Belgium, the UK, Ireland, Germany, France, Sweden, Denmark, Norway, Australia and New Zealand.

Origins 
The ideas behind the Tovertafel originated in 2009 from the PhD research of Hester Anderiesen. Anderiesen started her research at the faculty of industrial design Engineering (IDE) at Delft University of Technology. Ultimately, this research, in which she investigated how to keep people in the mid to late stages of dementia active, and to counteract apathy, led to a prototype of the device. The Tovertafel appeared on the market as a product in 2015. In the same year, Anderiesen also founded the company behind the Tovertafel, called Active Cues, based in Utrecht.

Awards 
Dutch Game Awards: Best Serious Game
Boer & Croon Management: Co-generation award
New Venture '15
PwC Social Impact Lab: scale-up
EIT Digital Challenge 2018
EY Entrepreneur Of The Year '18 finalist

References

External links 
 
 
 

2015 video games
Computer-related introductions in 2013
Regionless game consoles
2010s toys
Video games developed in the Netherlands
Educational hardware
Video gaming in the Netherlands